Hockey, or more specifically, field hockey, was first introduced to the South American Games as a men's and women's tournament at the 2006 Games.

History
After being introduced in the 2006 South American Games, the field hockey tournament was absent at the 2010 South American Games, but returned in 2014.

In the men's competition, Argentina are the most successful national team, having won gold at every edition of the tournament. The Argentine women's team is also the most successful national team in the women's competition, also having won gold at every edition of the tournament.

Men's tournament

Results

Summary

* = hosts

Team appearances

Women's tournament

Results

Summary

* = hosts

Team appearances

Medal table

Total

Men

Women

See also
 Men's South American Hockey Championship
 Women's South American Hockey Championship

References

 
Sports at the South American Games
South American Games
South American Games